Wendell Harper Lovett (April 2, 1922 - September 18, 2016) was a Pacific Northwest architect and teacher.

Born and raised in Seattle, Washington, Lovett entered the University of Washington program in architecture in 1940, but his college years were interrupted by wartime service.  He graduated from the University of Washington with a B.Arch in 1947.  While at Washington he was significantly influenced by Professor Lionel Pries.  Lovett attended MIT for one year, studying under Alvar Aalto and receiving his M.Arch. in June 1948.  He returned to Seattle and after a brief apprenticeship, opened his own practice.

Lovett joined the University of Washington architecture faculty in 1948, as an instructor.  He served as an assistant professor, 1951–60; associate professor, 1960–65; and professor, 1965-1984; although he retired in 1984, he continued to teach until about 1990.  Lovett was a guest professor at the Technical University in Stuttgart, Germany, in 1959-60.  He was a professor emeritus from 1984 until his death.

Lovett was the designer of many significant Pacific Northwest houses.  Most important is the house he designed for Charles Simonyi, in Medina, Washington.  Begun in 1987, the house has been expanded twice to Lovett's design.  The house not only serves as a residence, but is also designed for display of Simonyi's collection of paintings by Victor Vasarely and Roy Lichtenstein.

Lovett was elected a Fellow of the American Institute of Architects in 1985.  He received the AIA Seattle Chapter Medal in 1993.

References 

 Hildebrand, Grant, and Booth, T. William, The Houses of Wendell Lovett & Arne Bystrom, University of Washington Press, Seattle and London 2004

External links
Photographs of Wendell Lovett's works from the Phyllis and Robert Massar Photograph Collection of Pacific Northwest Architecture - University of Washington Digital Collection

1922 births
American architects
Fellows of the American Institute of Architects
MIT School of Architecture and Planning alumni
Modernist architects
Architects from Seattle
University of Washington College of Built Environments alumni
University of Washington faculty
2016 deaths
American military personnel of World War II